The Hong Kong men's national tennis team represents Hong Kong in Davis Cup tennis competition and are governed by the Hong Kong Tennis Association.

Hong Kong contested Asia/Oceania Group I on four occasions in 1989, 1993-95 but failed to negotiate the opening round.

History
Hong Kong competed in its first Davis Cup in 1970.

Current team (2022) 

 Coleman Wong
 Wong Hong-kit
 Wong Chun-hun
 Chan Kwok Shun Dasson (Junior player)

See also
Davis Cup
Hong Kong Fed Cup team

References

External links

Davis Cup teams
Davis Cup
Davis Cup